Bradley Richard Ward (born November 23, 1956) is a former politician in Ontario, Canada. He served in the Legislative Assembly of Ontario from 1990 to 1995 as a New Democrat and was a junior minister in Bob Rae's government from 1993 to 1995.

Background
Ward was a Bell Canada employee before entering political life. Active in the labour movement, he served on the Brantford and District Labour Council and was named Labour Citizen of the Year in 1989.

Municipal politics
He ran for the Brantford City Council in 1982 on a Labour Council/New Democratic Party ticket and finished third in the second ward.

Ward was elected to city council on his second attempt in 1985, the only successful candidate to be endorsed by the labour council. He was re-elected without opposition in 1988. While on council, he served as chair of Brantford's Riverfest.

Electoral record

See the 1985 Brantford election page for information on Potter and Mellor.

See the 1982 Brantford election page for information on O'Regan and Sywyk.

Municipal results are taken from the Brantford Expositor.

Provincial politics
Ward was elected to the Ontario legislature in the 1990 provincial election, defeating Liberal incumbent Dave Neumann in the Brantford riding. The New Democratic Party won a majority government in this election under Bob Rae's leadership, and Ward entered the legislature as a government backbencher. He was parliamentary assistant to the Minister of Skills Development from 1990 to 1991 and then to the Minister of Industry, Trade and Technology from 1991 to 1993.

On February 3, 1993, he was promoted to minister without portfolio in the Ministry of Finance, where he worked under Finance Minister Floyd Laughren. He did not have formal ministerial responsibilities, and his duties included represented the Rae government at events such as pre-budgetary consultations. Ward was credited with helping to bring a women's shelter to Brantford during his time in government.

In May 1993, the Rae government cancelled a plan to move the computer and telecommunications division of the Ministry of Government Services from Toronto to Brantford, citing financial concerns. Three days earlier, Ward had told a local reporter that Brantford residents should not be worried about changes to the plan. Some criticized him as being unaware of shifts in government policy. Ward later confronted protesters who opposed the policy change and defended what he described as a "tough expenditures decision."

The New Democratic Party was defeated in the 1995 provincial election, and Ward finished third against Progressive Conservative candidate Ron Johnson in Brantford.

Cabinet positions

Electoral record

Provincial election information is taken from Elections Ontario.

After politics
Ward returned to private life after 1995, working for Bell Canada in business technology. At one time, he served as president of the Communications, Energy and Paperworkers Union of Canada, Local 45. The Brant New Democratic Party honoured him for his involvement in public life in September 2000.

References

External links

1956 births
Brantford city councillors
Living people
Ontario New Democratic Party MPPs